Freddie Keil was a musician most notable as a member of The Keil Isles in New Zealand in the 1950s and 1960s. The former dry cleaner was born in Western Samoa and was part German. He migrated to New Zealand. In the 1950s he joined cousins Olaf, Rudolf, Klaus and Herma Keil and they became The Keil Isles which went on to become one of New Zealand's most successful groups of the 1950s and 1960s. After having a falling-out with his cousin Herma he left the band and formed his own group The Zodiacs who were to eventually change into Freddie Keil and the Kavaliers.

After releasing 11 singles on the Zodiac Records label and an LP up to 1965 they broke up.

Freddie Keil recorded some singles under his own name as well. Later Freddie Keil moved to Rarotonga in the Cook Islands, married a Cook Islander and had two daughters. Freddie also started the 'first' FM Radio Station in the South Pacific Area at Rarotonga and long before New Zealand had ever gone FM.

Keil died in 1994 in Rarotonga.

Discography

Freddie Keil and the Kavaliers
 I Found A New Love / Three Nights A Week – Zodiac Z-1063  – (1961)
 What About Me / Take Good Care of Her –  Zodiac Z-1079 (1962)
 The Wanderer / Twisting The Night Away – Zodiac Z-1085 – (1962
 Should I / Its Only A Paper Moon – Zodiac Z-1105 – (1963)
 All The Other Boys Are Talking / Take These Chains From My Heart – Zodiac Z-1109 – (1963)
 Don't Try To Fight It Baby / No Signs of Loneliness Here – Zodiac Z-1114 – (1963)
 Girls / Learnin', Trying To Forgive – Zodiac Z-1147-  (1963)

The Freddie Keil Five
 Talk / Splish Splash – Zodiac Z-1187 (1964)

Freddie Keil
 The Twist / Tossin' And Turning Zodiac Z-1082 (1962) – (Note side 2 credited to The Kavaliers)
 I've Got My Eyes on You / Move On – Zodiac Z-1177- (1964)
 I Surrender Sweetheart / tapiri Mai – Armar AR-1001

References

1994 deaths
New Zealand people of German descent
Samoan emigrants to New Zealand
Samoan people of German descent
New Zealand pop singers
Viking Records artists
Samoan emigrants to the Cook Islands
Year of birth missing